Qurqania (also spelled Qurqanya or Korkania) is a town in Syria, administratively part of the Harem District of the Idlib Governorate. Qurqania is the administrative center of the Qurqania Subdistrict, which contained 13 localities with a collective population of 12,522 in 2004. According to the Syria Central Bureau of Statistics, Qurqania itself had a population of 2,050 in the 2004 census.

References

Towns in Syria
Populated places in Harem District